Championship Rally, known as  in Japan, is a 1991 racing video game published by HAL Laboratory and made for the Nintendo Entertainment System. This game was not released in North America and is considered semi-rare.

Gameplay
The game features a variety of courses, weather and track conditions, and the ability to customize many of the player's cars features. Since it was a single-player only game, there was no need for two cars to be customized.

References

1991 video games
Nintendo Entertainment System games
Nintendo Entertainment System-only games
Rally racing video games
Video games developed in Japan